Camp de Tarragona is a natural and historical region of Catalonia, Spain. It includes a central plain, surrounded by the Serralada Prelitoral mountain chain on the west and in the north, with the Mediterranean sand beaches of the Costa Daurada on the east and limited in the south by the Coll de Balaguer. The main towns are Tarragona, Reus, Valls and Cambrils. Salou is an important resort destination. 

The region is regarded as the second metropolitan area of Catalonia, hosting the most important chemical complex in Spain as well as one of the main ports. Among the most distinctive agricultural produce of the region are hazelnuts, olives, wine and fish. It is also one of the major tourist areas in Catalonia, mainly due to the variety of beaches, holiday attractions like the remains of the Roman important past of Tarragona (one of the UNESCO World Heritage Sites in Spain), samples of the Catalan Modernisme style (particularly in Reus, Gaudí's hometown) and PortAventura World (PortAventura Park, the most visited theme park in Spain, Ferrari Land and also the PortAventura Caribe Aquatic Park).

The area has a common history going back to 1356. In 1936, the region was politically divided into three comarques: Alt Camp, Baix Camp and Tarragonès.

According to the General Territorial Plan of Catalonia, the Camp de Tarragona region is one of the seven functional territorial sections of Catalonia. It covers, however, a greater area, as the neighbouring comarques of Baix Penedès, Priorat and Conca de Barberà are also included. Under the 2006 Statute of Autonomy of Catalonia, the four provinces which make up Catalonia are due to be replaced by seven vegueries, which will also take over many of the functions of the comarques. While the final boundaries of the new vegueries have yet to be approved, the vegueria of Camp de Tarragona will most likely be formed by the same six comarques above mentioned, with the only possible exception of Baix Penedès if the historical region of the Penedès was finally accepted as an eighth vegueria, as requested by many local councils.

Veguerie

The Veguerie (Vegueria in Catalan) was an important feudal land division in the Principality of Catalonia, Kingdom of Sardinia, and Duchy of Athens during the Middle Ages and into the Modern Era until the Nueva Planta decrees of 1716. It was the primary division of a county in Catalonia and the basic territorial unit of government in Sardinia and Athens after those countries became part of the Crown of Aragon. The office of a veguer was called a vigeriate (Latin: vigeriatus). 

In 1936, Catalonia was reconstituted into comarques. Although these were quickly abolished in 1939 they were reconstituted again in 1987. Each comarca was grouped with two to four others into a veguerie, of which there were nine, with their capitals at Barcelona, Girona, Tremp, Vic, Manresa, Lleida, Reus, Tarragona, and Tortosa. 

Since the 1987 reconstitution it has been decided that Vegueries be formally re-established in 2011. Under the 2006 Statute of Autonomy of Catalonia, the four provinces which make up Catalonia are due to be replaced by seven vegueries, which will also take over many of the functions of the comarques. As of October 2008, whereas the final boundaries of the new vegueries have yet to be formally approved, they are expected to incorporate largely historical boundaries: Àmbit metropolità de Barcelona, Alt Pirineu i Aran, Camp de Tarragona, Comarques Centrals, Comarques Gironines, Ponent or Lleida, Terres de l'Ebre.

References

Geography of Catalonia
Natural regions of Spain
Functional territorial sections of Catalonia